Morinville is a town in the Edmonton Metropolitan Region of Alberta, Canada.

History 

Morinville was settled by Jean-Baptiste Morin, a priest and missionary of the Missionary Oblates of Mary Immaculate, who brought many French settlers in the late 1800s, followed by several German pioneers.

The monument located in St. Jean Baptiste Park lists the many names of pioneers and settlers to Morinville. Once situated on the street at 100 Avenue and 100 Street, the monument was moved to its present location in 2000, as it was a safety hazard and very difficult to enjoy with all the traffic at the intersection.

The first post-office opened in 1894.

The Roman Catholic Church of the St. Jean Baptiste Parish was built in 1907. The church, along with its adjacent but now inoperative convent Morinville Convent, was declared a historical site in 1975. In 2005, the grounds of the church were landscaped with a clock tower, new grass, trees and shrubs, in celebration of Alberta's 100th anniversary as a province. On June 30 2021, the church was completely destroyed by a suspicious fire, still under investigation.

Morinville has a long history of successful business ventures as one of the first locations in Western Canada to open a Royal Bank of Canada in 1910 and a credit union in 1940. A series of successful international business ventures include Champion Pet Foods, which exports around the world.

Demographics 

The population of the Town of Morinville according to its 2020 municipal census is 10,578, a  change from its 2016 municipal census population of 9,893.

In the 2016 Census of Population conducted by Statistics Canada, the Town of Morinville recorded a population of 9,848 living in 3,491 of its 3,611 total private dwellings, a  change from its 2011 population of 8,569.

Economy 
As of 2010, 93% of Morinville's tax base is residential in nature. One of the town's larger businesses, Champion Pet Foods, employs approximately 50 people.

Attractions 
Recreation amenities in Morinville include walking trails, a splash park, a trout pond, a skateboard park, a hockey arena, a curling rink, numerous parks and playgrounds, and outdoor fitness equipment stations along the trail system and at the splash park among other amenities. Other recreation amenities are available in St. Albert and Edmonton to the south.

The Morinville Leisure Centre (MLC) opened in May 2019. The facility contains an arena, a multi-use court space and a small gym. Future expansion of this facility is in consideration.

Education 
The Sturgeon Public School Division operates 2 schools in MorinvilleÉcole Morinville Public (ECE to Grade 4) and Four Winds Public School (Grade 5–9). Greater St. Albert Catholic Regional Division offers faith-based education in three schoolsÉcole Notre Dame Elementary, Georges H. Primeau Middle School and Morinville Community High School. Prior to 2011, Morinville had only Catholic schools, and no secular or Protestant schools. This led to non-Catholic parents starting an advocacy campaign to introduce a secular option for education in Morinville. In response, Sturgeon School Division and the Town of Morinville agreed to provide space for a secular education program for grades 1–4 for the 2011–2012 school year. Further, the Government of Alberta committed to conducting a census in Morinville, Legal, St. Albert and a portion of Sturgeon County to determine the minority faith in the area as a precursor to developing a long-term solution to address secular education in Morinville.

Media 
Morinville is served by four local weekly newspapers — The Free Press,  Farm 'n' Friends, the St. Albert Gazette, and The Morinville News.

See also 
List of towns in Alberta
List of communities in Alberta

References

External links 

1901 establishments in the Northwest Territories
Edmonton Metropolitan Region
Towns in Alberta